Jiménez Municipality may refer to:

Jiménez Municipality, Chihuahua, Mexico
Jiménez Municipality, Coahuila, Mexico
Jiménez Municipality, Lara, Venezuela
Jiménez Municipality, Tamaulipas, Mexico

See also
Jiménez (disambiguation)

Municipality name disambiguation pages